Hectaphelia hectaea is a species of moth of the family Tortricidae. It is found in South Africa.

References

Endemic moths of South Africa
Moths described in 1911
Archipini